Filippa Idéhn (born 15 August 1990) is a Swedish professional handballer who plays as a goalkeeper for Silkeborg-Voel KFUM and the Swedish national team.

International achievements
European Championship:
Bronze Medalist: 2014
Carpathian Trophy:
Winner: 2015

References

External links

 

1990 births
Living people
Sportspeople from Jönköping
Swedish female handball players
Swedish expatriate sportspeople in Denmark
Swedish expatriate sportspeople in France
Swedish expatriate sportspeople in Romania
Expatriate handball players
Handball players at the 2016 Summer Olympics
Olympic handball players of Sweden
IK Sävehof players
CS Minaur Baia Mare (women's handball) players